Italia '61 is a station of the Turin Metro in Turin, Italy.

The station is located next to the Piedmont Region Headquarters, a skyscraper under construction, in the Nizza Millefonti neighbourhood.

History 
The mayor of Turin, Chiara Appendino, provided an updated timeline on the project in November 2020, stating that construction on both Italia '61 and Bengasi stations should be completed by the end of January 2021. This would be followed by a phase of track testing, including trains that will travel without passengers. She added that the station would open to the public in Spring 2021. The station opened on 23 April 2021.

References

External links
 Official project page

Turin Metro stations